Continental was a bulk carrier that sank, or was wrecked in Lake Michigan off the coast of Two Rivers, Wisconsin, United States. In 2009 the shipwreck site was added to the National Register of Historic Places.

History

Continental was built in Cleveland, Ohio in 1882.

References

1882 ships
Transportation in Manitowoc County, Wisconsin
Shipwrecks of the Wisconsin coast
Shipwrecks on the National Register of Historic Places in Wisconsin
Shipwrecks of Lake Michigan
National Register of Historic Places in Manitowoc County, Wisconsin
Ships built in Cleveland